Pierre Brambilla (12 May 1919 at Villarbeney in Switzerland – 13 February 1984 at Grenoble, France) was a French professional road cyclist. He was of Italian origin but adopted French nationality on 9 September 1949. He was known as "la Brambille" and he won the King of the Mountains competition in the 1947 Tour de France where he also finished third overall and wore the yellow jersey as leader of the general classification for two days.
In that 1947 Tour, Brambilla was leading the race at the penultimate day, with Aldo Ronconi at 53 seconds and Jean Robic at 2'58". At the last stage, Caen-Paris, Robic and Édouard Fachleitner attacked, and finished more than 13 minutes before Brambilla, taking the first two places. Brambilla was the first cyclist to lose the lead in the Tour de France on the last stage. Brambilla is pictured in the short story "Brambilla" by Julian Barnes, published in his collection of short stories Cross Channel (1996).

Major results

1939
Lyon–Grenoble–Lyon (with Giuseppe Martino)
1941
Montluçon
1942
Vuelta a España:
Winner stage 10
Mountains classification circuit de France
1943
Carcassonne
Circuit du Mont Ventoux
Course du Mont Chauve
GP d'Espéraza
GP Haute Savoie
Perpignan
1945
Annecy–Grenoble–Annecy
1946
Tour de l'Ouest
1947
Paris–Clermont-Ferrand
Tour de France:
Winner Mountains classification
3rd place overall classification
Wearing yellow jersey for two days
1949
Cahors

External links

Pierre Brambilla dans le Tour de France 

French male cyclists
French Vuelta a España stage winners
1919 births
1984 deaths
People from the canton of Fribourg